Ram Dayal is the current head of the Ramsnehi Sampradaya (headquarters Shahpura, Bhilwara).

Dayal was born on 26 September 1956 in Indore.

He was accepted as a disciple by Bhagatram Ramsnehi (based in Chittorgarh), on Falgun Budi 14, Bikram Samwat 2030.

On 20 January 1994, he was elected as the head of the Ramsnehi Sampradaya, by members of the organization, as per the tradition. He succeeded Ramkishor at the position.

The Ramsnehi trust runs the following activities inspired by him :
 Ramsnehi Chikitsalaya (Hospital) in Bhilwara
 Swami Ramcharan Kanya Vidyapeeth (Women's College), Bhilwara
 Go-shala in Pushkar, Rajasthan

He is conducting the 265th "Chaturmasa" stay at Vrindavan, India.

See also 
 Ram Charan Maharaj
 Shahpura, Bhilwara
 Ram Kishor Ji Maharaj
 Ramdwara
 Sri Ram Snehi Bhaskar Magazine

References

 Shree Ram Dayal Ji Maharaj at Chittorgarh http://www.bhaskar.com/article/MAT-RAJ-OTH-c-199-51737-NOR.html

1956 births
Living people
Indian Hindu monks